Sir James Lamont, 1st Baronet (26 April 1828 – 29 July 1913) was a Scottish  explorer, particularly known for his travels in the Arctic; he also travelled to Africa and the West Indies. He was a fellow of the Geological Society of London and the Royal Geographical Society. Lamont Island in the Franz Josef Land archipelago of Russia is named for him.

He served as the Liberal Member of Parliament for Buteshire (1865–68). On 16 July 1910, he was created a Baronet of Knockdaw in the parish of Inverchaolain in the county of Argyll.

References

External links 
 

1828 births
1913 deaths
Scottish explorers
Fellows of the Geological Society of London
Fellows of the Royal Geographical Society
Members of the Parliament of the United Kingdom for Scottish constituencies
UK MPs 1865–1868
Baronets in the Baronetage of the United Kingdom
Scottish Liberal Party MPs
British Army officers